The Union of People's Fedaian of Iran is a socialist organization that publishes a monthly magazine called Iran Today.  

The organization was established in April 1994, following the Convention of Unity Congress.  It emerged as a response to a series of political, theoretical and organizational discussions between the two currents of the Fedaie movement:  Organization of Iranian People's Fedai Guerrillas and Fedaian Organization.

History
The Union of People's Fedaian of Iran emerged from a series of political, theoretical, and organizational discussions between the two currents of Fedaie movement: Organization of Iranian People's Fedai Guerrillas and Fedaian Organization.  During the last two decades of Shah Mohammad Reza Pahlavi's rule, members of these two organizations and other combatants were actively involved in the struggle against his regime.

Revolution
All of these different groups took part in the Iranian revolution in 1979.  Soon after the revolution, they fought against the newly established Islamic Republic of Iran  

While the group had a favorable social and political position from which to organize, it failed to achieve its goals. Some surmise that this was due to a lack of necessary political experience, an unclear view of how the people could be organized, and no comprehensive agenda.

Split
The first reaction to this failure resulted in the split of the organization into two parts: the Majority and the Minority.  While the split revealed the right and left currents within the organization, a lack of the experience of internal dialogues and democratic standards meant that the splitting currents could not define their ideological, political and organizational differences.  This led to more splits within the ranks of the Majority and Minority.

Reunification
Some people from the left and right currents of previous splits have come back together under the Union of People's Fedaian of Iran banner.  

The right current that is present in the reunified organization continue to promote reformist and conciliatory policies towards the regime.  However, it has clearly distinguished itself both theoretically and ideologically from the Majority.  When the dissolution of the Majority section into the Tudeh Party of Iran was proposed, this group split from the Majority in defiance. In the following years this current, having learned its lesson from the previous failures, criticized its past policies and gradually returned to the revolutionary left movement. In 1989, the Fedaie Organization of Iran was formed, as a result of the unity between this organization and the Organization for the Emancipation of Labor.  (The latter had been established by the former cadres and members of the Minority.)

The left current present in the reunified Union of People's Fedaian of Iran, was initially aligned with the Minority.  In spite of its revolutionary stance against the regime, it adopted ultra leftist policies.  The Minority also faced several splits because of the lack of a clear agenda.

The progress toward reunification of Fedaies was made possible through the revision of the theoretical principles, proposing clear political lines, dispensing with sectarian attitudes toward unity and coalition, learning from the past failures, and achieving principled understanding about democratic relations among the left forces as well as within the organization ranks.

See also
 Guerrilla groups of Iran
 Iranian People's Fedai Guerrillas
 Organization of Iranian People's Fedaian (Majority)
 Fedaian Organisation (Minority)
 Organization of Iranian People's Fedai Guerrillas

References

External links
http://www.etehadefedaian.org

Militant opposition to the Islamic Republic of Iran
Political party alliances in Iran
Socialism in Iran